Jean Mercier may refer to:

 Jean Mercier (engineer) (1901–1971), French engineer
 Jean Le Mercier (died 1397), French politician, advisor to kings Charles V and Charles VI
 Jean Mercier (Hebraist) (died 1570), French Hebraist
 Jean Ernest Mercier (1840–1907), French translator, historian and politician